Parapotamos (before 1928: Βάρφανη - Varfani) is a village and a former municipality in Thesprotia, Epirus, Greece. Since the 2011 local government reform it is part of the municipality Igoumenitsa, of which it is a municipal unit. The municipal unit has an area of 60.334 km2. Population 1,168 (2011). The village of Parapotamos, the former municipality's seat, was home to Cham Albanians, before 1944, when they were expelled for collaborating with Nazi forces.

Name
The name of Parapotamos means "riverside" or "by the river" in the Greek language. The village is known as Varfanj in Albanian, which comes from varfër/varfanjak meaning "poor", thus Varfani, "poor area" or "poor region" in Albanian.

References

Populated places in Thesprotia
Former Cham settlements